Archaeoattacus staudingeri is a species of moth in the genus Archaeoattacus found on the Malay Peninsula and on Borneo.  The species is a deeper, more purplish brown than A. atlas, with a more angular forewing postmedial that is edged distad by grey patches in the spaces and concave distad anterior to the angle. The forewing apical markings are grey rather than pale brown or yellow.

Only two specimens have been taken in Borneo, both in lowland forest in Brunei.

Biology
There is no information on the life history but it is likely to be comparable to that of Archaeoattacus edwardsii.

References

Further reading
Attacus staudingeri Rothschild, 1895, Novit. zool., 2: 36.
Archaeoattacus staudingeri Rothschild; Allen, 1981: 111; Lampe, 1985: 7.

Moths described in 1895
Saturniinae
Moths of Asia